is a Japanese sprinter who specializes in the 100 metres.

Born in Hikone, Shiga Prefecture, Kiryū played football while at elementary school and became interested in track and field at junior high school, as his brother took part in the sport. In 2011, he won the under-16 national title in the 100 metres at the National Sports Festival of Japan, with a time of 10.58 seconds.

The following year, Kiryū ran in the under-18 category at the same competition and broke the world youth best for the 100 metres by bettering Tamunosiki Atorudibo's record of 10.23 seconds by two hundredths of a second on 5 October 2012. Less than a month later, on 3 November 2012, Kiryū lowered his own record to 10.19 seconds.

On 29 April 2013, Kiryū (still a student at Rakunan High School in Tō-ji) ran at the Oda Memorial meet and tied the World junior record of 10.01 seconds co-held by Darrel Brown and Jeffery Demps. The IAAF subsequently rejected the inclusion of the time as an official record due to the use of unapproved wind-speed measurement equipment on the track.

At the 2016 Summer Olympics, Kiryū won a silver medal in the 4 × 100 metres relay.

References

External links
 
 
 Yoshihide Kiryū at JAAF 
 

1995 births
Asian Athletics Championships winners
Asian Games gold medalists for Japan
Asian Games medalists in athletics (track and field)
athletes (track and field) at the 2016 Summer Olympics
athletes (track and field) at the 2018 Asian Games
athletes (track and field) at the 2020 Summer Olympics
Japan Championships in Athletics winners
Japanese male sprinters
living people
medalists at the 2016 Summer Olympics
medalists at the 2018 Asian Games
Olympic athletes of Japan
Olympic male sprinters
Olympic silver medalists for Japan
Olympic silver medalists in athletics (track and field)
sportspeople from Shiga Prefecture
World Athletics Championships athletes for Japan
World Athletics Championships medalists
21st-century Japanese people